Following is an incomplete list of films, ordered by year of release, featuring depictions of martial arts.

See also
Combat in film
List of mixed martial arts films
List of Kalarippayattu films
List of ninja films
Martial arts film
 List of films featuring Wing Chun

References

 
Martial arts